Stream substrate (sediment) is the material that rests at the bottom of a stream. There are several classification guides. One is:

Mud – silt and clay.
Sand – Particles between 0.06 and 2 mm in diameter.
Granule – Between 2 and 4 mm in diameter.
Pebble – Between 4 – 64 mm in diameter.
Cobble – between 6.4 and 25.6 cm in diameter
Boulder – more than 25.6 cm in diameter.

Stream substrate can affect the life found within the stream habitat. Muddy streams generally have more sediment in the water, reducing clarity. Clarity is one guide to stream health.

Marine substrate can be classified geologically as well. See Green et al., 1999 for a reference. 

Mollusks and clams that live in areas with substrate, and need them to survive, use their silky byssal threads to cling to it. See Cteniodes Ales for reference.

See also
 Grain size
 Substrate (biology)

Aquatic ecology
Marine biology